Valentine is a masculine given name, feminine given name, and a surname, derived from the Roman family name Valentinus, which was derived from the Latin word valens, which means "strong and healthy." Valentine can be considered an English translation or adaptation of the names Valentinus or Valentinian. 
It was the name of several saints of the Roman Catholic Church. St. Valentine's Day was named for a third-century martyr. The usual feminine form of the name is Valentina.

People with the given name
 Saint Valentine, 3rd century Roman saint
 Valentine of Passau (died 475), Catholic saint, monk, abbot, bishop and hermit
 Pope Valentine (died 827), briefly Roman Catholic pope
 Valentine Abt (1873–1942), American composer and mandolin player 
 Valentine Ackland (1906–1969), English poet
 Valentine Berriochoa, one of the Vietnamese Martyrs
 Valentine Colasante (born 1989), French ballet dancer
 Valentine de Saint-Point (1875–1953), French poet, playwright and painter
 Valentine Dyall (1908–1985), British actor 
 Valentine Fleming, father of author Ian Fleming
 Valentine Hollingsworth (1632-1710), settler of the Delaware Colony
 Valentine Holmes (born 1995), rugby league player and American football player
 Valentine Kipketer (born 1993), Kenyan half marathon and marathon runner
 Val Page, British motorcycle designer
 Valentine Tessier (1892–1981), French actress
 Valentine Warner (born 1972), British television chef
 Valentin Glushko, Soviet designer of rocket engines

People with the surname

Actors
 Anthony Valentine (1939–2015), English actor
 Brooke Valentine, actress
 Gary Valentine, actor
 Karen Valentine, American actress and star of Room 222
 Kym Valentine, actress
 Scott Valentine (actor)
 Stacy Valentine, pornographic actress
 Steve Valentine, actor

Artists
 DeWain Valentine (born 1936), American sculptor
 Edward Virginius Valentine, sculptor
 James Valentine (photographer)

Businesspeople
 Alexander Valentine, Chairman of London Transport from 1959 to 1965
 Brian Valentine, software executive
 Don Valentine, businessman
 Elmer Valentine, nightclub owner

Musicians
 Ann Valentine (1762–1842), English organist and composer
 Dickie Valentine, pop singer
 Hilton Valentine, guitarist
 James Valentine (musician)
 James Valentine (Australian musician)
 Kathy Valentine, guitarist
 Kid Thomas Valentine, trumpeter
 Robert Valentine (composer) (c. 1671–1747)

Politicians
 Daniel Mulford Valentine (1830–1907), Kansas politician and judge
 Edward K. Valentine (1843–1916), 19th-century politician
 Emery Valentine (1858–1930), Alaskan politician
 Itimous T. Valentine Sr. (1887–1970), North Carolina politician and judge
 John K. Valentine (1904–1950), Iowa politician
 John L. Valentine (fl. 1970s–2010s), Utah politician
 Hugh Valentine (1848–1932), New Zealand Member of Parliament
 Lewis Valentine (1893–1986), Welsh politician and activist
Mary Valentine (born 1946), Michigan politician
 Rob Valentine (born 1950), Lord Mayor of Hobart
 Tim Valentine (1926–2015), North Carolina politician

Scientists
 David H. Valentine (1912-1987), British botanist
 James W. Valentine, American evolutionary biologist

Sportspeople
 Alf Valentine, cricketer
 Bobby Valentine, former baseball manager of MLB teams (Texas Rangers, New York Mets, and Boston Red Sox) and of Japanese baseball team Chiba Lotte Marines
 Bryan Valentine, cricketer
 Carl Valentine, footballer
 Cheryl Valentine, Scottish field hockey midfielder
 Chris Valentine, hockey player
 Darnell Valentine, basketball player
 Dave Valentine Scottish rugby union and rugby league footballer
 Ellis Valentine, baseball player
 Greg Valentine, wrestler
 Howard Valentine, track and field athlete
 John Valentine, Canadian cricketer
 Johnny Valentine, wrestler
 Josh Valentine, rugby footballer
 Rob Valentine Scottish rugby union and rugby league footballer
 Ryan Valentine, footballer
 Scott Valentine (ice hockey)
 Vincent Valentine (cricketer)

Others
 George Valentine (disambiguation) 
 Helen Valentine (1893-1986), founder of Seventeen magazine
 Herbert J. Valentine (1917–1996), American Marine officer, flying ace and Navy Cross recipient
 Jean Valentine, poet
 Jean Valentine (bombe operator)
 Jo Valentine, pseudonym of Charlotte Armstrong
 Jo Valentine, Baroness Valentine
 Lewis J. Valentine (1882–1946), Police Commissioner of New York City
 Penny Valentine (1943–2003), music critic
 Phil Valentine, radio host
 Robert M. Valentine, a business partner of Rowland Hussey Macy
 Tsakane Valentine, soprano
 William Orison Valentine (1862–1928), missionary

Fictional characters
 Aubrey Valentine, minor character from the British soap opera EastEnders
 Beka Valentine, Andromeda
 Billy Ray Valentine, from the film Trading Places, played by Eddie Murphy
 Calvin Valentine, Hollyoaks
 Carmel Valentine, Hollyoaks
 Cat Valentine, character from the television series Victorious
 Cat Valentine, character from the television series  Sam & Cat
 Charity Hope Valentine, Sweet Charity
 Diane Valentine, Hollyoaks
 Dick Valentine, fictional radio call-in show host, National Lampoon
 Eddie Valentine, from the film The Rocketeer portrayed by Paul Sorvino
 Elphelt Valentine, playable character in the video game Guilty Gear Xrd
 Emily Valentine, on the television series Beverly Hills, 90210
 Esther Valentine, The Young and the Restless
 Funny Valentine, in "Steel Ball Run", the 7th arc of Jojo's Bizarre Adventure
 Faye Valentine, Cowboy Bebop
 Isabella "Ivy" Valentine, from the videogame Soul Calibur
 Jill Valentine, from the videogame and film Resident Evil
 Hilda Valentine Goneril, in Fire Emblem Three Houses
 Jimmy Valentine, the main character in O. Henry's short story "A Retrieved Reformation" and a number of movies based on it
 Keith Valentine, vampire in the game Shadow Hearts
 Kenneth Valentine, protagonist of The Golden Globe by John Varley
 Luke and Jan Valentine, in the Hellsing (TV series) anime
 Leo Valentine, in the soap opera Hollyoaks
 Mai Valentine, alternative name of Mai Kujaku, character of Yu-Gi-Oh!
 Melody Valentine, the drummer for the group Josie and the Pussycats
 Nick Valentine, a synth private detective and companion in Fallout 4
 PC Roger Valentine, in the television series The Bill
 Ramlethal Valentine, playable character in the video game Guilty Gear Xrd
 Richmond Valentine, antagonist of Kingsman: The Secret Service
 Sasha Valentine, in the soap opera Hollyoaks
 Scarlet Valentine, in Jojo's Bizarre Adventure
 Shirley Valentine, from the play of the same name
 Skeeter Valentine, from the Nickelodeon cartoon Doug
 Sonny Valentine, in the soap opera Hollyoaks
 Tiffany Valentine, in the Child's Play franchise films: Bride of Chucky, Seed of Chucky, Curse of Chucky, and Cult of Chucky, as well as the Chucky TV series (2021-present)
 Vincent Valentine, from the video games Final Fantasy VII and Dirge of Cerberus: Final Fantasy VII
 Valentine D'Artagnan, protagonist of La Femme Musketeer
 Valentine Coverly in Tom Stoppard's play Arcadia
 Valentine "Val" McKee in Tremors (1990 film)
 Valentine Michael Smith, in Robert Heinlein's novel Stranger in a Strange Land
 Valentine de Villefort, in The Count of Monte Cristo
 Valentine Wannop, in Ford Madox Ford's Parade's End tetralogy
 Valentine Warleggan, in the Poldark novels by Winston Graham
 Valentine Wiggin, from the Ender's Game book series by Orson Scott Card
 Valentine, in William Shakespeare's The Two Gentlemen of Verona
 Valentine, gentleman of Orsino in Shakespeare's Twelfth Night
 Valentine, in the medieval romance Valentine and Orson
 Valentine, the protagonist of Robert Silverberg's Lord Valentine's Castle
 Valentine, juggler in the film MirrorMask
 Valentine Morgenstern, the primary antagonist in Cassandra Clare's The Mortal Instruments series
 Valentine, in the video game Guilty Gear 2: Overture
 Valentine, a playable character in the video game Skullgirls
 Valentine, in the original 2015 Edinburgh cast of Love Birds: the musical, played by Ruth Betteridge

Name variants
Balendin (Basque)
Валентин Valentìn, Валю Valyu, Вальо Valyo, Валедин Vàledin (Bulgarian)
Bálint (Hungarian)
Folant (Welsh)
Valentino, Tino (Italian)
Ualan (Scottish Gaelic)
Val (English)
Βαλεντίνος (Valentinos) (male), Βαλεντίνα (Valentina) (female) (Greek)
Valentijn (Dutch)
Valentín (Slovakian), Spanish
Valentin (Bulgarian), (Croatian), (Czech), (French), (German), (Romanian), (Russian), (Scandinavian), (Slovenian)
Valentino, Valentina (Italian)
Valentyn (Ukrainian)
Vali, Valentin (Romanian)
Walenty (Polish)
Valentim, Valentina (Portuguese)
 Βαλεντίνη (female) (Greek)

Notes

See also
 Justice Valentine (disambiguation)

Masculine given names
English masculine given names
French feminine given names